Román Arámbula (September 18, 1936 – March 19, 2020) was a Mexican comic strip artist and animator.

External links

References

1936 births
2020 deaths
National Autonomous University of Mexico alumni
Mexican cartoonists